Lincoln Junior High School may refer to:
 Lincoln Junior High School, Taft, California, Taft City School District
 Lincoln Junior High School, Skokie, Illinois (Chicago area), Skokie/Morton Grove School District 69
 Abraham Lincoln Junior High School (now Gregory-Lincoln Education Center), Houston, Texas, Houston Independent School District

See also 
 Lincoln Junior - Senior High School (disambiguation)
 Lincoln Middle School (disambiguation)